Adam Bohling is a British film producer.

Filmography
He was a producer in all films unless otherwise noted.

Film

Production manager

Location management

Second unit director or assistant director

Miscellaneous crew

Thanks

References

External links
 

British film producers
Year of birth missing (living people)
Living people
Unit production managers